Sarah Brendel is a Folk/Pop singer from Dresden, Germany. She has achieved success in Germany and internationally, releasing an album with Franklin, Tennessee-based Inpop Records in 2005. Her song "Be With You" spent two weeks on the German singles chart in 2002 and peaked at No. 86. She is part of the Zeichen der Zeit (Sign of the Times) project alongside artists such as Xavier Naidoo and Yvonne Catterfeld. This project proved to be her break after it landed on top 10 German album charts. As well, her song "Fire" reached number 86 on the American Billboard airplay charts.

One of Brendel's musical influences early in her career was Larry Norman. In 2008 Norman recorded his two last songs with her: "Back to the Dust" and "Walking Backwards" appear on Brendel's record Early Morning hours. The song "Take My Heart" from her self-titled album appeared in the movie The Poet. CCM magazine praised that album's excellent lyrics.

Discography 

Singles
 "Be With You" (ZYX, 2002)
 "Take My Heart" (ZYX, 2003) (in the film soundtrack The Poet with Jürgen Prochnow)
 "Fire" (Inpop, 2005)

Songs in other projects
 In Love with Jesus (box set), "Gott Sieht Unsere Tränen" (Gerth Medien, 2005)
 Every Young Woman's Battle, "Breathing In" (Fervent, 2005)
 Mystic Spirits, Vol. 8, "Hands" (ZYX, 2005)
 Absolute Smash Hits, Vol. 2, "Fire" (Fervent/Curb, 2005)

Awards
 2009 David Award (best album) Early Morning Hours

References

External links 
 [ Sarah Brendel at AllMusic]. Accessed 25 April 2009.
 Sarah Brendel at Jesus Freak Hideout. Accessed 25 April 2009.

Living people
German pop musicians
German performers of Christian music
Christian music songwriters
Inpop Records artists
German women pop singers
Musicians from Dresden
German women singer-songwriters
German singer-songwriters
German guitarists
Year of birth missing (living people)